Paulsgrove Football Club is a football club based in the Paulsgrove area of Portsmouth, Hampshire, England. The club is affiliated to the Hampshire Football Association. The club is an FA Charter Standard club. The club was formed in 1964. They joined the Hampshire League Division Two in 1987 and played in that league's Division One between 1993 and 1996.

History
In 1987–88 the club joined the Hampshire League in division Two, five seasons later they gained promotion to division one in the 1992–93 season. They stayed for a few seasons but were relegated back to division two in 1995–96. Three seasons later the club were champions of Division two in the 1998–99 season. However instead of being promoted the club remained in the second tier, now named Division one, of The Hampshire League after it was re-organised for the 1999–2000 season. In 2004–05 they then left the Hampshire league to join the newly formed Division three of the Wessex league, two seasons later this division was renamed division two.

At the end of the 2006–07 season, Paulsgrove left the Wessex league to become one of the founding members of the Hampshire Premier League. In October 2007 the club gained a bye in the Hampshire Cup under somewhat unusual circumstances: drawn at home to play Kingston Arrows (a side composed entirely of long-stay prisoners), their opponents were unable to fulfil the fixture. The club continue to play in the Hampshire Premier league and during their period in the league have won the senior league cup once in the 2008–09 season.

The 2017–18 seasons saw the club win the Hampshire Premier league senior division and the Hampshire intermediate cup.

Ground

Paulsgrove play their games at Paulsgrove Social Club, Marsden Road, Paulsgrove, Portsmouth PO6 4JB.

Honours

Wessex League Division Three
Winners: 2005–06
Hampshire League Division Two 
Winners: 1998–99
Hampshire Premier League senior division
Winners 2017-2018
PEHPFL Senior Cup
Winners: 2008–09
Runners-up: 2009–10, 2011–12
 Hampshire Combination and Development League East Division
 Winners 2021-22

Records

Highest League Position
8th in Wessex league Division Two: 2006–07

References

External links
 Hampshire league club information page

Sport in Portsmouth
Association football clubs established in 1987
Football clubs in Hampshire
1987 establishments in England
Football clubs in England
Hampshire League
Wessex Football League
Hampshire Premier League